The Montshire Museum of Science is a hands-on science museum located in Norwich, Vermont, United States.

Description 
It has over 150 exhibits relating to the natural and physical sciences, ecology, and technology. Its live animal exhibits include a hive of honeybees that is connected to the outdoors, a colony of leafcutter ants, and aquariums that feature life in local waters.

Each year, the museum holds an annual igloo build.

Programs

History 
The name "Montshire" is a portmanteau of "Vermont" and "New Hampshire". It was founded in 1974 by Robert Chaffee, former Museum Director of the Dartmouth College Museum, after the natural history museum there was closed, and received title to much of the former museum's collections in 1976. The Montshire Museum was first located in a former bowling alley building in 1976  in Hanover, New Hampshire, and was later moved across the Connecticut River to Norwich in 1989.

References

External links

Official website

Science museums in Vermont
Natural history museums in Vermont
Museums in Windsor County, Vermont
Buildings and structures in Norwich, Vermont
Museums established in 1976
1976 establishments in New Hampshire
1989 establishments in Vermont